Nixburg is a census-designated place in Coosa County, Alabama, United States.

History
Nixburg was established by 1850 by Solomon Robbins, who moved there from North Carolina, and was originally called Robbinsville. It was later renamed Nixburg in honor of the Nix family, who were early settlers of the area. Its post office was established in 1836 and closed in 1978. The Oakachoy Covered Bridge, which was formerly listed on the National Register of Historic Places and the Alabama Register of Landmarks and Heritage, was located in Nixburg. The bridge was destroyed by vandals on June 2, 2001. The Old Shiloh Cemetery, also located in Nixburg, is listed on the Alabama Register of Landmarks and Heritage.

Demographics
It was first named as a CDP in the 2020 Census which listed a population of 329.

2020 census

Note: the US Census treats Hispanic/Latino as an ethnic category. This table excludes Latinos from the racial categories and assigns them to a separate category. Hispanics/Latinos can be of any race.

Notable people
Leven H. Ellis, 15th Lieutenant Governor of Alabama from 1943 to 1947
William Garrett, former Alabama Speaker of the House, Alabama State Senator from 1863 to 1865, and member of the 1875 Alabama Constitutional Convention.

References

Census-designated places in Alabama
Census-designated places in Coosa County, Alabama
Census-designated places in Elmore County, Alabama